Coșula Monastery is a monastery of monks located in the village of Coșula (in Botoșani County), at a distance of 20 kilometers southeast of Botoșani city. This is reached by walking 3 km on a county road on the right DN 28 B. Coșula Monastery dates from the year 1535, when the great treasurer Mateiaș built a monastic complex here. The Coșula monastery was the only one in Botosani county that also had the painted exterior. It is also known for its 500-year-old fresco and the legendary Yellow Coșula. On the fresco are represented the scene of Pentecost and the "Savior's Cross".

It is listed as a historic monument by Romania's Ministry of Culture and National Identity.

References

 

Romanian Orthodox monasteries of Botoșani County
Historic monuments in Botoșani County
Churches completed in 1535